Ksenia Anatolyevna Klimenko (born 1 November 2003) is a retired Russian artistic gymnast. She is the 2018 Youth Olympics Uneven Bar Champion, the 2017 European Youth Summer Olympic Festival All-Around Champion and the 2018 European Junior all-around bronze medalist.

Early life
Klimenko was born in Surgut, Khanty-Mansi Autonomous Okrug, Russia in 2003. She currently trains at Gazprom Transgaz Surgut and represents the Ural district.

Gymnastics career

Junior

2016
In April Klimenko competed at the Russian National Championships as an espoir where she won gold in the all-around, on the uneven bars, and on balance beam. She also placed third on floor exercise and sixth on vault and won silver in the team final with the Ural district.

2017
Klimenko competed at the WOGA Classic in early 2017. She placed third in the all-around behind fellow Russian Angelina Simakova and American Audrey Davis. She later competed at the City of Jesolo Trophy where she placed third in the team final, twelfth in the All-Around, seventh on uneven bars, fourth on balance beam, and fifth on floor exercise. At the Russian National Championships Klimenko placed first in the junior All-Around, on uneven bars, and on balance beam. She also placed third on floor and fifth on vault. In the summer Klimenko competed at the European Youth Summer Olympic Festival where she won gold in the All-Around, on balance beam, and on floor exercise and won silver on uneven bars.

2018
Klimenko competed at the City of Jesolo Trophy in April. Russia placed second in the team competition and individually Klimenko placed first on uneven bars.

Klimenko competed at the 2018 European Women's Artistic Gymnastics Championships where Russia won team silver behind Italy. Individually Klimenko won uneven bars gold and bronze in the all-around behind Giorgia Villa of Italy and Amelie Morgan of Great Britain. She was later selected to represent Russia at the 2018 Youth Olympics taking place in Buenos Aires, Argentina. There she qualified in third place to the floor exercise and balance beam finals and in fifth place to the individual all-around final and to the uneven bars final.  In the individual all-around final she faltered on uneven bars and vault and once again finished in fifth place, making her the first Russian to not win the all-around since the inception of the Youth Olympic Games.  She later won gold in the uneven bars finals, matching the result of previous Russian Youth Olympic athletes Viktoria Komova and Seda Tutkhalyan. She also won silver on the balance beam behind Tang Xijing of China and placed seventh on floor exercise after a fall.

Senior

2019
Klimenko competed at the Russian National Championships in March where she finished sixth in the all-around.  It was later announced that Klimenko would compete at the Tokyo World Cup in April, replacing Angelina Simakova who would instead compete at the 2019 European Championships.  Later in March Klimenko competed at the EnBW DTB-Pokal Team Challenge in Stuttgart where she helped Russia win silver in the team final.  At the Tokyo World Cup Klimenko finished in eighth place after falling off the uneven bars, crashing her uneven bars dismount, and placing her hands on the balance beam.

In August Klimenko competed at the Russian Cup where she finished twelfth in the all-around and did not qualify for any event finals.

Competitive history

International Scores

References

External links

 

2003 births
Living people
Russian female artistic gymnasts
European champions in gymnastics
Gymnasts at the 2018 Summer Youth Olympics
Youth Olympic gold medalists for Russia
Sportspeople from Surgut
21st-century Russian women